The Providence Preservation Society is a private, non-profit organization based in Providence, Rhode Island.  The organization's mission is to preserve the architectural heritage of Providence, Rhode Island.  The organization was originally formed in 1956 by area residents including preservationist Antoinette Downing  to preserve historic 18th and 19th century buildings on College Hill which were threatened with demolition.  The Society owns several buildings including the Brick Schoolhouse (1768) and Shakespeare's Head building (1772) and garden.

See also

Brick Schoolhouse (1768)

References

External links
The Providence Preservation Society Official Web Site.

Historic preservation organizations in the United States
Organizations based in Providence, Rhode Island
Non-profit organizations based in Rhode Island
Preservation (library and archival science)
Historical societies in Rhode Island